Ditrysinia is a plant genus of the family Euphorbiaceae first described as a genus in 1825. It contains only one recognized species, Ditrysinia fruticosa, the Gulf Sebastian-bush, native to the southeastern United States (E Texas, Louisiana, SW Arkansas, Mississippi, Alabama, N Florida, Georgia, North + South Carolina).

Formerly included
moved to Stillingia 
Ditrysinia sylvatica (L.) Raf. ex B.D.Jacks. - Stillingia sylvatica L.

References

Hippomaneae
Monotypic Euphorbiaceae genera
Flora of the Southeastern United States
Taxa named by Constantine Samuel Rafinesque